Maharshi is the soundtrack album composed by Devi Sri Prasad for the 2019 Tollywood film of the same name starring Mahesh Babu, Pooja Hegde, and Allari Naresh in lead roles, directed by Vamshi Paidipally. The film marks Devi's second collaboration with Paidipally after Yevadu (2014). The album consists of eight songs with Sri Mani penning all the lyrics of the Telugu version. The soundtrack album was released digitally on 15 May 2019 on the Aditya Music label.

Background and production 
The film marks Devi's second collaboration with Paidipally after Yevadu (2014) and fourth collaboration with Mahesh Babu after 1: Nenokkadine (2014), Srimanthudu (2015) and Bharat Ane Nenu (2018). Music production of the film began in early 2019, in parallel to film's shooting. DSP's regular collaborator Sri Mani has written all the tracks for the Telugu version. In an interview with Cinema Express, lyricist Sri Mani said that "It’s important to blend the ideas of the director and music composer with my words. It’s imperative to be on the same page as them. I try to write lines that gel with the director’s vision, stay true to the story, the situation of the song, the character, and the tune. However, the challenge is always to find something good, new, and interesting to write".

The first single "Choti Choti Baatein" is based on the friendship between three lead roles (played by Babu, Hegde and Naresh) during their college life. Second single "Nuvve Samastham" explores the success of the character Rishi (played by Babu). The song was shot at various locations in the New York City, including the Statue of Liberty. On singing "Everest Anchuna" song, Vishnupriya Ravi told The Hindu that "I prefer fast, peppy numbers because I feel it suits my voice". Fourth single "Padara Padara" is based on the importance of agriculture focusing on the new-age farming and the issues being faced by farmers in India. The Indian Express reporting the release of the song, cited that "Mahesh Babu plays the saviour of distressed farmers". The fifth single "Paala Pitta" is a folk track, with Manasi getting praise for her voice.

Release 
A total of eight tracks were featured in the soundtrack album. Initially the jukebox of the film is reported to be released on 25 April 2019, which was later released on 30 April 2019, a day before the film's pre-release event. The official soundtrack (jukebox) has six tracks, while the total soundtrack which was released on 1 May 2019 during the pre-release event, has eight tracks. Out of the eight tracks, five tracks in the soundtrack album were released as singles. The first single "Choti Choti Baatein", written by Sri Mani and sung by Devi Sri Prasad, was released on 29 March 2019 coinciding with Friendship Day. The Album's second single "Nuvve Samastham", written by Sri Mani and sung by Yazin Nizar, was released on 12 April 2019. The third single "Everest Anchuna", a peppy song sung by Vedala Hemachandra and Vishnupriya Ravi, was released on 20 April 2019. The fourth single "Padara Padara", sung by Shankar Mahadevan, was released on 24 April 2019. Fifth single "Paala Pitta", sung by Rahul Sipligunj and M. M. Manasi, was released on 29 April 2019. All these singles were first released in lyrical version and later in the full video version. Lyrical version of two tracks in the extended soundtrack were released on 4 and 15 May 2019 (after the release of the soundtrack album). Full video versions of all the tracks were released in June and July 2019, including the remaining one track. After the success of the soundtrack album, Devi Sri Prasad released a tribute video in June 2019, featuring the entire music production team.

Marketing 
Various music artistes of the soundtrack album, have performed the eight songs at the film's pre-release event held at People's Plaza, Necklace Road, Hyderabad.

Track listing

Telugu

Tamil

Reception

Critics 
Neeshita Nyayapati of The Times of India praised the score of the film and wrote that "the OST of Maharshi is good for a one-time listen with most of the numbers sounding situational; they might work better when seen on-screen. The two duet numbers are mediocre, but lend some pep to the otherwise sombre album. It is only Nuvvu Samastham that manages to stand out, thanks to Yazin’s vocals." Another critic opined that few tracks have similarities with Devi's previous compositions. Giving a rating of 2.5 out of 5, it was said that "The album is not exciting by any stretch. 'Idhe Kadha Nee Katha' and 'Padara Padara' take the cake for the impact they create. The rest of the songs appeal only to a limited extent. At least the friendship song should have pushed the envelope."

On reviewing the "Padara Padara" song, Vyas of The Hans India praised Mahadevan's vocals, Devi's music and the lyrics written by Sri Mani. 123Telugu opined that "the album of Maharshi is definitely not Devi Sri Prasad’s best works. He churns out numbers which are situational and suit the mood of the film. Though the songs will not be chartbusters, they have their own charm."

Accolades

Album credits 
Credits adapted from Aditya Music

Producer(s) 
Devi Sri Prasad

Songwriter(s) 

 Devi Sri Prasad (composer, arranger)
 Sri Mani (lyrics)

Performer(s) 
Devi Sri Prasad, Shankar Mahadevan, Yazin Nizar, Vedala Hemachandra, Vishnupriya Ravi, Benny Dayal, Rahul Sipligunj, M. M. Manasi, Vijay Prakash, Karthik

Musician(s) 

 Guitars – Josh Mark Raj, Godfray Immanuval
 Keyboard – Vikas Badisa, Kalyan, K. P., Devi Sri Prasad, Chinna, Venkatesh, Ravi, Chaitu,
 Rhythm – Kalyan, Sundar
 Sarangi – Manonmani
 Accordion – Rajkumar
 Flute – Kiran Kumar
 Shehnai – Balesh
 Violin – Chennai Strings, Rithu Vysakh
 Viola – Rithu Vysakh
 Additional Rhythm – K. P.
 Backing vocals – Ranina Reddy, Surmukhi Raman, Anitha, Roshini

Personnel 

 Orchestra In-Charge – Murugan
 Album Co-ordinator – B. Manikandan
 Chorus conducted by – J Chittey Prakash Rao

Sound Engineers 

 Brindavan–The Garden Of Music, Chennai – A. Uday Kumar
 Assistant Sound Engineer – Kutty Uday
 Assistant Sound Engineer – Suresh

Production 

 Recorded by – A. Uday Kumar, T. Uday Kumar & Suresh Kumar Taddi
 Mixed by – Vinay Sridhar, Santhosh Narayanan
 Mastered by – A. Uday Kumar @ New Edge Studios, Mumbai
 Assisted by – Pugalendhi

Notes

References

External links 

 Maharshi (soundtrack) at IMDb

2019 soundtrack albums
Devi Sri Prasad soundtracks
Aditya Music soundtracks
Telugu film soundtracks
Action film soundtracks
Drama film soundtracks